The Venturi Atlantique was a mid-engined, fiberglass-bodied French sports car produced by Venturi Automobiles from 1991 to 2000.

Atlantique 260

Atlantique 300
Scotsman Hubert O'Neill purchased Venturi in 1994 and conceived of the Venturi 400GT as well as a revised Atlantique. After a rushed design time of six months, the new Atlantique 300 was unveiled at the Paris Motor Show.

Venturi again went into receivership in 1996, and was bought by Thai firm Nakarin Benz, under whom the company focused its concentration upon road cars.

Atlantique 300 Biturbo

Venturi 300 GTR

In 1999, 2 cars were built exclusively for track racing. They were designated Venturi 300 GTR.

Reception and fate
Sales of the Atlantique were extremely poor; total Venturi sales over its lifespan amounted to fewer than 700, despite praise from contemporary critics and from Top Gear. In a 1992 episode, Jeremy Clarkson noted that the two most exciting sports cars of the time were the Alpine A610 and the Venturi Atlantique, and that the Atlantique was "like having your own personal jet fighter [...] I love it to death." In comparing the biturbo Atlantique and the Lotus Esprit, Performance Car noted that the Atlantique was "[...] a more relaxing car to drive, its tidier dimensions make it easier to place, it rides more smoothly, generates far less road noise, and has a much slicker gearchange. It's better built too."

Venturi again faced bankruptcy in 2000, and the Atlantique went out of production. Although current owner Gildo Pallanca Pastor, a Monegasque millionaire, has resumed production of Venturi cars, he has shifted the emphasis to electric sports cars such as the Venturi Fétish, retiring the Atlantique badge. Company production will be even more limited at 10 units per year.

References

Venturi Atlantique 300
History of the Venturi enterprise

Sports cars
Venturi vehicles
Cars introduced in 1991
Rear mid-engine, rear-wheel-drive vehicles